Dark Shadows: Angelique's Descent is a Big Finish Productions abridged reading of Lara Parker's own novel, based on the long-running American horror soap opera series Dark Shadows.

Plot 
Angelique Bouchard grew up on the island of Martinique but it was a meeting with Barnabas Collins that was to change her life...

Cast
Angelique – Lara Parker
The Dark Lord – Andrew Collins

External links
Angelique's Descent - Part 1: Innocence
Angelique's Descent - Part 2: Betrayal

Dark Shadows audio plays
2007 audio plays